Grand Prix is the fifth album by Scottish alternative rock band Teenage Fanclub, released in May 1995 via Creation Records.

Album cover
The now-defunct Formula One racing team Simtek provided the car that appears on the front cover.

Reception

Upon release, Grand Prix received almost unanimous critical acclaim. Writing for The Independent, Andy Gill called it "winsome and reflective", while Angela Lewis of the same publication described Grand Prix as a "breathtakingly superb (album) with finely honed dynamics, nagging harmonies and deceptively simple lyrics". In 2000, Q placed Grand Prix at number 72 in its list of the "100 Greatest British Albums Ever". It was voted number 624 in the 3rd edition of Colin Larkin's All Time Top 1000 Albums (2000). In 2004, it made number 72 on The Observer Music Monthly'''s top 100 British albums list. In 2013, NME ranked it at number 282 in its list of the 500 Greatest Albums of All Time.

Track listing

Notes
All bonus tracks produced by Teenage Fanclub. Tracks 1 and 2 recorded at Protocol Studios, London, engineered by Giles Hall, assisted by Delphine Carrier. Track 3 recorded at Protocol Studios, London, engineered by Giles Hall, and at The Greenhouse, London, engineered by Nick Wollage. Track 4 recorded at Riverside Studios, Glasgow, engineered by Duncan Cameron. Track 5 recorded at home by Norman Blake.Grand Prix'' bonus 7" single

Note
First vinyl pressing with limited edition bonus 7".

Personnel

Charts

References

Teenage Fanclub albums
1995 albums
Creation Records albums
Country rock albums by Scottish artists